Yuri Mikhailovich Vshivtsev (11 January 1940 – 26 April 2010) was a Russian professional football player.

Career
Vshivtsev began playing football with local side FC Dynamo Kirov. In the 1960s, he played forward for FC Dynamo Moscow, helping the club win the Soviet Cup and the Soviet Top League, plus two runner's-up finishes. Overall he scored 78 goals in 245 league matches.

Honours
 Soviet Top League champion: 1963.
 Soviet Top League runner-up: 1962, 1967.
 Soviet Cup winner: 1967.

References

External links
 
 Profile at fc-dynamo.ru

1940 births
Sportspeople from Kirov, Kirov Oblast
2010 deaths
Soviet footballers
Association football forwards
FC Dynamo Kirov players
FC Dynamo Moscow players
PFC CSKA Moscow players
FC Dynamo Barnaul players
Soviet Top League players
FC Dynamo Vologda players